The McNeely House is a historic house located at 305 Main Street in Colfax in Grant Parish, Louisiana.

It was built in 1883 as a two-story brick and frame large Creole-style cottage, and was expanded with small side wings in 1893.  It has a second story gallery with square posts whose upper two-thirds are turned into Doric columns.

The house was listed on the National Register of Historic Places on March 31, 1983.

See also
National Register of Historic Places listings in Grant Parish, Louisiana

References

Houses on the National Register of Historic Places in Louisiana
Houses completed in 1883
Grant Parish, Louisiana
Creole architecture in Louisiana